Zheleznodorozhny is a rural locality (a settlement) and the administrative center of Troitskoye Rural Settlement, Usolsky District, Perm Krai, Russia. The population was 1,815 as of 2010. There are 31 streets.

Geography 
Zheleznodorozhny is located 38 km southeast of Usolye (the district's administrative centre) by road. Shishi is the nearest rural locality.

References 

Rural localities in Perm Krai
Usolsky District, Perm Krai